The World Mahjong Championship is played to determine the World Champion in the table game Mahjong held by World Mahjong Organization (WMO). Both men and women are eligible to contest this title, and the championship holds both of Individual event and Team event.

History
Since the propagation of Mahjong at the beginning of the 20th century, the rules of Mahjong have been inconsistent all around the world. In January 1998, Mahjong was certified as the 255th sport by General Administration of Sport of China at the urging of Japan. In September, unified Chinese rules were codified for international competitions. On October 23, 2002, the first world championship was held in Iidabashi, Tokyo, Japan over three days, but this event was not counted as the first world championship.

After the establishment of World Mahjong Organization(WMO) in 2006, the official first world championship was held in Chengdu, Sichuan, China on November 1, 2007 and lasted for five days. Li Li, a Chinese student of Tsinghua University, won the championship. In team event, China Shanxi Jiexiu won the championship with 94 table points.

On June 15, 2007, World Mahjong ltd.(WML), the company based on Hong Kong, promoted the World Series Of Mahjong (WSOM) in Macau. This event took the prize system of US$1,000,000 and the winner was given US$500,000. This event was a competition held by a private company and it was not certified by WMO.

The second official World Mahjong Championship (WMC) took place in Utrecht from August 27 to August 29, 2010. The new World Champion again comes from China: Ms. Linghua Jiao won the competition with 32 table points (acquired in 9 sessions). The follow-ups were both Europeans – the same held true for the country ranking, which was calculated as a team score of the best three national players from each country: China ranked first with 85 table points, followed by France (78 TP) and Denmark (77 TP).

Champions

Individual

Team

Venues

See also
Guobiao Majiang(Official rule)
List of world championships in mind sports
Mahjong
Open European Mahjong Championship
World Mahjong Organization
World Series Of Mahjong

References

External links
2nd World Mahjong Championship Official Site
6th World Mahjong Championship Official Site

Mahjong world championships